Javin Edward Hunter (born May 9, 1980) is a former American football wide receiver. He played college football at the University of Notre Dame, and was drafted by the Baltimore Ravens in the sixth round of the 2002 NFL Draft. He also played a season for the San Francisco 49ers. Hunter's father James also played in the NFL, and his son Jaden Ivey played college basketball for Purdue and in 2022 was drafted with the fifth pick of the First Round by the Detroit Pistons.

Education
Hunter attended high school at Detroit Country Day School in Beverly Hills, Michigan, where he was a 3-time All-State and USA Today All-American basketball player while teaming with former Miami Heat player and Duke standout Shane Battier for three straight state basketball championships.

In football, he was a first-team Parade All-American, USA Today second-team All-American, rated 34th best player nationally by The Sporting News and 37th best player by Chicago Sun-Times.  He was also rated one of the top 3 wide receivers in the country by the Dallas Morning News, PrepStar and Street and Smith magazine.  Hunter was a top recruit for the legendary and former Notre Dame wide receiver coach Urban Meyer and committed to the University of Notre Dame.

In a run-heavy Notre Dame offense under Bob Davie, he was Notre Dame's top receiver in 2001 and lead the team in catches and receiving yards that same year. He was also a member of the Irish basketball team in his freshman year under former NBA coach John Macleod. Hunter's father was James Hunter, a former all-pro defensive back for the Detroit Lions from 1976 to 1982.

NFL career 
Hunter was drafted by the Baltimore Ravens in the sixth round of the 2002 NFL Draft. He first showed promise as a rookie scoring two touchdowns, including one on a 99-yard kick return against the New York Jets.  Hunter was named one of ten rookies to watch for the 2002 season by The Sporting News.  He finished the 2002 season playing in 12 games, 4 of them starts. He also averaged 26.3 yards on kick returns, including a 63-yard return against the Indianapolis Colts.

The next year, Hunter tore his Achilles tendon and missed the entire season. In September 2005, he made the switch to cornerback from wide receiver.  However, after an injury during camp he was given an injury settlement by the Ravens.  Hunter was then picked up by the San Francisco 49ers in 2005.

Personal life

Hunter has a son, Jaden Ivey, with former University of Notre Dame point guard and current women's basketball head coach Niele Ivey. Jaden was an All-American basketball player at Purdue University and currently plays for the Detroit Pistons. Hunter has another son, Jordan Hunter.

References

1980 births
Living people
Players of American football from Detroit
American football wide receivers
Baltimore Ravens players
Notre Dame Fighting Irish football players
Detroit Country Day School alumni